Jess Turner (July 6, 1888 – death date unknown) was an American Negro league first baseman in the 1910s.

A native of Mount Sterling, Alabama, Turner made his Negro leagues debut in 1911 with the Kansas City Royal Giants. He went on to play for the Leland Giants, Chicago Giants, and All Nations clubs.

References

External links
 and Seamheads

1888 births
Year of death missing
Place of death missing
All Nations players
Chicago Giants players
Leland Giants players
Baseball first basemen
Baseball players from Alabama
People from Choctaw County, Alabama
Kansas City Royal Giants players